Black Dog Barking is the third studio album by the Australian hard rock band Airbourne and the follow-up to their 2010 album No Guts. No Glory. The album was released in Europe and Australia on 20 May 2013, and worldwide on 21 May 2013.

Background
It was announced in November 2011 through their official Facebook page that since mid-2011 the band had been working on a new album. The album's name, Black Dog Barking, was announced in early February 2013. Following this, the band released the following statement:

The Album was released on 21 May 2013 via Roadrunner. Black Dog Barking is Airbourne's first full-length album not to feature the band on the cover art. The artwork was once again created by Australian artists The Sharp Brothers, who also did the cover artwork for No Guts. No Glory. According to David Roads, the idea behind the album title was, to use the Black Dog as a metaphor for the band's ability to break the rules, especially not to care for db limits.  At the end of 2013 Airbourne toured Europe, supported - amongst others - by the Swedish band Corroded.

Track listing

Personnel 
 Joel O'Keeffe - lead vocals, lead guitar
 David Roads - rhythm guitar, backing vocals
 Justin Street - bass, backing vocals
 Ryan O'Keeffe - drums

Charts

References

External links 
 

2013 albums
Airbourne (band) albums
Roadrunner Records albums